Booker T. Washington High School for the Performing and Visual Arts (BTWHSPVA) is a public secondary school located in the Arts District of downtown Dallas, Texas, United States.  Booker T. Washington HSPVA enrolls students in grades 9-12 and is the Dallas Independent School District's arts magnet school (thus, it is often locally referred to simply as Arts Magnet). Many accomplished performers and artists have been educated in the school. Some examples include Ernie Banks, Norah Jones, Erykah Badu, Adario Strange, Valarie Rae Miller, Edie Brickell, Kennedy Davenport, Sandra St. Victor, Roy Hargrove, and Scott Westerfeld.

History

In 1892, Dallas established its first high school for African-American pupils. In 1911, the school was enlarged and named the Dallas Colored High School. The school was moved in 1922 to larger quarters, designed by famed Dallas architects Lang and Witchell, and renamed Booker T. Washington High School, after the African-American education pioneer Booker T. Washington. For many years, it was the only Dallas high school that allowed students of color.

In 1939, Wilmer-Hutchins Colored High School of the Wilmer-Hutchins ISD burned down in a fire. Afterwards, African-American WHISD students were sent to DISD high schools for "colored" people such as Washington.

In 1942, teacher Thelma Paige Richardson sued the Dallas School District, demanding equalization of pay based upon tenure and merit; the school district denied that any discrimination was taking place. Richardson, with the help of the NAACP, won the case, increasing general awareness of discrimination in the public school system.

In 1952, it was enlarged yet again, and given the new name as Booker T. Washington Technical High School.

In 1976, the school was repurposed as the Arts Magnet at Booker T. Washington High School, inheriting and expanding the magnet-school arts curriculum that had been in place in the Performing Arts Cluster at Skyline High School since 1970.  The Arts Magnet became a prototype for magnet schools across the country.  The repurposing was part of the federal court desegregation orders that created the magnet school system in Dallas ISD (Tasby v. Estes). Paul Baker was selected by Superintendent Estes as founding director of the school.

The neighborhood surrounding Washington has evolved into the Dallas Arts District. The main school building was designated an official Dallas Landmark in 2006.

In 2008, the building was enlarged a third time when a new $65-million facility designed by Brad Cloepfil of Allied Works Architecture, was completed. The expansion preserved the historic main building.

Statistics
The attendance rate for students at the school is 96%, equal with the state average; 32% of the students at Washington are economically disadvantaged, 2% enroll in special education, 31% enroll in gifted and talent programs, and 1% are considered "limited English proficient."
The class of 2017 managed to receive over $60 million in offered scholarships and grants.

The ethnic makeup of the school is 39% White American, 23% African American, 32% Hispanic American, 3% Asian American/Pacific Islander American, 3% multiracial, and 1% American Indian/Alaskan Native.

The average class sizes at Washington are 20 students for English, 27 for foreign language, 19 for math, 22 for science, and 25 for social studies.

Notable faculty 

 Julia Caldwell Frazier

Notable alumni

Notable alumni include:
 Erykah Badu - Grammy Award-winning artist
 Zac Baird - keyboardist for nu metal band Korn
 Ernie Banks - Hall of Fame baseball player
 Bill Blair - Negro leagues baseball player, newspaper publisher
 Edie Brickell - Grammy Award-winning artist
 Miguel Cervantes - actor, Hamilton in Chicago and on Broadway
 Reed Easterwood - rock guitarist
 Laganja Estranja - RuPaul's Drag Race season six, top eight
 Kennedy Davenport - RuPaul's Drag Race season seven, top four
 Todd Duffey - actor, Office Space (1999), Waiter with "flair"
 Arlo Eisenberg - X Games in-line skate athlete and visual artist
 Shahine Ezell - actor, producer, DJ
 Froy Gutierrez - actor, singer, model
 Roy Hargrove - Grammy Award-winning jazz musician, performer
 Darius Holbert - film/TV composer, album producer, performer
 Willie Hutch - singer, songwriter
 Norah Jones - Grammy Award-winning artist
Shaun Martin - Grammy Award-winning jazz musician
Bunny Michael - visual artist, musician, and rapper
 Elizabeth Mitchell - actress, known for her role as Dr. Juliet Burke on Lost
 Ephraim Owens - musician (trumpet)
 Shawn Pittman - blues rock singer, multi-instrumentalist, songwriter, and record producer
 Marc Rebillet - electronic musician and YouTube performer
 Julia Scott Reed - journalist
 Don Sidle - NBA draft pick from the University of Oklahoma
Erica Tazel - actress (Justified, Roots, Mafia III, Firefly)

See also

 History of the African Americans in Dallas-Fort Worth
 List of things named after Booker T. Washington

References

External links

Booker T. Washington High School for the Performing and Visual Arts

Booker T. Washington HS photos at the Portal to Texas History
Arts Magnet Building Campaign

Dallas Independent School District high schools
Public high schools in Dallas
Public magnet schools in Dallas
Downtown Dallas
Schools of the performing arts in the United States
Texas classical music
Dallas Landmarks
Historically segregated African-American schools in Texas
Booker T. Washington